Albert Krais is a retired West German slalom canoeist who competed in the early-to-mid 1950s. He won a silver medal in the folding K-1 team event at the 1951 ICF Canoe Slalom World Championships in Steyr.

References

External links 
 Albert KRAIS at CanoeSlalom.net

German male canoeists
Possibly living people
Year of birth missing
Medalists at the ICF Canoe Slalom World Championships